Pseudolamellodiscus is a genus of monopisthocotylean monogeneans in the family Diplectanidae. Species of Pseudolamellodiscus are parasites on the gills of marine perciform fish (Sphyraenidae and Polynemidae).

Species
According to the World Register of Marine Species, the following species are included in the genus:

 Pseudolamellodiscus forsterii Rakotofiringa & Maillard, 1979 
 Pseudolamellodiscus jelloi Rakotofiringa & Maillard, 1979 
 Pseudolamellodiscus nossibei Euzet & Razarihelisoa, 1959 
 Pseudolamellodiscus polynemus Rao & Kulkarni, 1985 
 Pseudolamellodiscus sphyraenae Yamaguti, 1953  (Type species)

References

Diplectanidae
Monogenea genera
Parasites of fish